Willey may refer to:

Places

United Kingdom
 Willey, Herefordshire, a civil parish of Herefordshire
 Willey, Shropshire, a village in Shropshire
 Willey, Warwickshire, a village and civil parish of Warwickshire
 Hundred of Willey, a hundred of Bedfordshire

United States
 Willey, Iowa, a city
 Mount Willey, a mountain in New Hampshire
 Willey House (New Hampshire), scene of a disaster in 1826

Other uses
 Willey (surname) (including a list of persons with the name)
 Willey (textile machine)

See also
 Willy (disambiguation)
 Wiley (disambiguation)
 Whiley
 Wily (disambiguation)
 Wylie (disambiguation)
 Wyllie
 Wylye (disambiguation)
 Wyle (disambiguation)
 Wyly
 Wile E. Coyote and Road Runner, a cartoon character